Haplorhynchites is a genus of leaf and bud weevils in the beetle family Attelabidae. There are ten species recognised in the genus Haplorhynchites.

Species
These 10 species belong to the genus Haplorhynchites:
 Haplorhynchites adrienneae Hamilton, 1974
 Haplorhynchites aeneus (Boheman, 1829) (head-clipping weevil)
 Haplorhynchites eximius (LeConte, 1876)
 Haplorhynchites hampsoni Legalov, 2003
 Haplorhynchites malabarensis Legalov, 2003
 Haplorhynchites planifrons (LeConte, 1876)
 Haplorhynchites pseudomexicanus Hamilton, 1974
 Haplorhynchites quadripennis (Fall, 1929)
 Haplorhynchites viridanus Legalov, 2003
 Haplorhynchites viridirostris Legalov, 2007

References

Further reading

 
 
 

Attelabidae
Articles created by Qbugbot